This articles lists events from the year 2017 in Benin.

Incumbents 

President: Patrice Talon
President of the National Assembly: Adrien Houngbédji

Events

Economic conditions
Benin's overall macroeconomic conditions were positive in 2017, with a growth rate of around 5.6 percent.  Economic growth was largely driven by Benin's cotton industry and other cash crops, the Port of Cotonou, and telecommunications.  Cashew and pineapple production and processing have substantial commercial potential.  The country's primary source of revenue is the Port of Cotonou, although the government is seeking to expand its revenue base. In 2017, Benin imported about $2.8 billion in goods such as rice, meat and poultry, alcoholic beverages, fuel plastic materials, specialized mining and excavating machinery, telecommunications equipment, passenger vehicles, and toiletries and cosmetics. Principal exports are ginned cotton, cotton cake and cotton seeds, cashew, shea butter, cooking oil, and lumber.

Deaths

References

Links

 
Years of the 21st century in Benin
Benin
Benin
2010s in Benin